General Sir Charles Parker Deedes,  (9 August 1879 – 9 March 1969) was a senior British Army officer who went on to be Military Secretary.

Early life
Deedes was born at Nether Broughton, Leicestershire, the son of the Revd Philip Deedes and educated at Winchester College and the Royal Military College, Sandhurst.

Military career
Deedes was commissioned into the King's Own Yorkshire Light Infantry as a second lieutenant in February 1899, and promoted to lieutenant on 9 October 1899. He served in the 2nd battalion, which was transferred to South Africa following the outbreak of the Second Boer War that month. For his service in the war, he was appointed a Companion of the Distinguished Service Order (DSO) in the October 1902 South African honours list. After the war ended in June 1902, he returned to regular service with his regiment, and transferred with the battalion to Malta, for which he left Point Natal on the SS Staffordshire in October.

He also served in World War I initially as a General Staff Officer at the General Headquarters of the British Expeditionary Force and then from 1916 with 14th Army Corps and from 1917 as a General Staff Officer with 2nd Division in France.

After the War he was appointed Deputy Director of Staff Duties at the War Office. In 1926 he became Commander of 3rd Infantry Brigade and in 1928 he was made General Officer Commanding 53rd (Welsh) Division. He became Director of Personal Services at the War Office in 1930 and Military Secretary in 1934.

He retired in 1937. He was promoted to general and held the colonelcy of the King's Own Yorkshire Light Infantry from 1927 to 1947.

During World War II he was an Area Commander for the Home Guard.

Family
He married Eve Mary Dean-Pitt and they went on to have a son (Major-General Charles Julius Deedes) and a daughter, Mary Josephine Deedes.

References

 

|-

|-
 

1879 births
1969 deaths
People educated at Winchester College
British Army generals
King's Own Yorkshire Light Infantry officers
Knights Commander of the Order of the Bath
Companions of the Order of St Michael and St George
Companions of the Distinguished Service Order
English cricketers
Hertfordshire cricketers
British Army personnel of the Second Boer War
British Army personnel of World War I
British Home Guard officers
Graduates of the Royal Military College, Sandhurst
Military personnel from Leicestershire